ISO/TC 279 is a  technical committee of the International Organization for Standardization (ISO). Its purpose is to develop, maintain and promote standards in the fields of innovation management. The first plenary meeting of ISO/TC 279 was held in Paris on 4 to 5 December 2013 under the leadership of its first chairperson and founder, Alice de Casanove (mandate 2013-2021). The ISO/TC279 is in charge of the ISO 56000 series (temporarily numbered ISO 50500 series)

Scope and mission
The scope of ISO/TC 279 is to standardize terminology, tools, methods and interactions between relevant parties to enable innovation in established organizations.

Each published standard within the ISO 56000 series should remove lack of harmonization in the field of innovation management and allow the professionalisation of this function. Some of the standards developed in the 56000 series are strictly informational, best practice, they cannot be used as a certification basis. For innovating organizations, this series of standards can facilitate more successful collaboration, develop higher capability to innovate and bring visibility to the innovation function.
The standard family is designed to support innovation in organisations whatever origin, type (public private), size (large, medium) etc. are. Nevertheless ISO 56002 on Innovation Management System does not address specific innovation management systems such as temporary organisations (for example: startup, consortium...) however, parts can be applicable to all types of organizations.

The expected benefits of ISO 56000 series are listed below:

Market Benefits
Provide guidance on how an organization can fulfil unmet customer needs
Increase business opportunities and open new markets
Lead to the consequent reduction in trade barriers
Reduce time to market
Enhance the competitiveness of various organizations
Answer to the need of both developed and emerging countries
Cultural Benefits
Develop open‐mindedness to accept new business models and methods
Promote the growth of an innovation culture with a global objective
Facilitate the implementation of partnerships
Improve collaboration and communication on a global scale
Implement social responsibility in the organization's innovation process
Organisational Benefits
Save cost and reduce risk when innovating and collaborating across borders due to the development of standard tools
Increase the organization ability to take decisions: test and try, fail fast, capability to take reasonable risks, facing challenges and world changes...
Improve the efficiency and the performance of the organizations to produce innovation
Improve results of innovation process and contributes to monitor the return of investments made in innovation
Share a globally accepted ‘common language’ for innovation management
Evaluate the progress of the organisation and identify and share good practices in innovation management

Members
ISO membership of TC 279 is open to any national standardization body. A member can be either participating (P) or observing (O), with the difference mainly being the ability to vote on proposed standards. There are 50 countries that are active participants of TC 279, and 19 observing countries. The secretariat is managed by AFNOR, located in Paris and the current chairperson is Johan Claire (mandate 2022-2024).

Other organizations can participate as Liaison Members, some of which are internal to ISO/IEC and some of which are external. The external organizations that are in liaison with TC 279 are: OECD,
WIPO, WTO, CERN, World Bank, and UNIDO.

Structure
Work on the development of standards is done by working groups (WGs), each of which deals with a particular field.

Standards

See also
 International Organization for Standardization
 ISO 56000
 List of ISO standards
List of ISO Technical Committees

References

External links
 ISO/TC 279 Business Plan
 http://www.iso.org/iso/home/standards_development/list_of_iso_technical_committees/iso_technical_committee.htm?commid=4587737
 https://www.iso.org/committee/4587737.html

279